Guzmán Casaseca Lozano (born 26 December 1984), sometimes known simply as Guzmán, is a Spanish professional footballer who plays for CD Badajoz as an attacking midfielder.

Club career
Born in Badajoz, Extremadura, Casaseca graduated from CD Badajoz's youth setup, and made his debut as a senior with the B team in 2002. He first appeared with the main squad on 15 December of that year, coming on as a late substitute in a 1–1 home draw against SD Eibar in the Segunda División.

In January 2005, Casaseca moved to RCD Mallorca B of Segunda División B. After one season at Xerez CD in the second level, he was loaned to Córdoba CF on 7 July 2006, contributing seven goals to the latter's promotion from division three and signing a permanent contract shortly after.

Casaseca scored his first professional goal on 13 June 2009, his team's only in a 1–3 away loss to Real Zaragoza. On 1 July, he joined CD Castellón also in the second tier on a two-year deal.

Casaseca signed with third-division AD Ceuta in 2010. After scoring 15 goals in 2011–12, he transferred to fellow league club Deportivo Alavés. He appeared regularly for the latter side, and on 5 July 2014 agreed to a two-year deal at UD Las Palmas.

On 16 July 2015, after achieving promotion to La Liga, Casaseca terminated his contract with the Canarians and joined Real Valladolid a day later.

References

External links

1984 births
Living people
Spanish footballers
Footballers from Extremadura
Association football midfielders
Segunda División players
Segunda División B players
CD Badajoz players
RCD Mallorca B players
Xerez CD footballers
Córdoba CF players
CD Castellón footballers
AD Ceuta footballers
Deportivo Alavés players
UD Las Palmas players
Real Valladolid players